Damir Džumhur was the defending champion but lost in the second round to Gianluca Mager.

Maxime Janvier won the title after defeating Stefanos Tsitsipas 6–4, 6–0 in the final.

Seeds

Draw

Finals

Top half

Bottom half

References
Main Draw
Qualifying Draw

Morocco Tennis Tour - Casablanca II - Singles